The men's football tournament at the 2014 Asian Games was held in Incheon and three other cities in South Korea from 14 September to 2 October 2014. The opening match was played 5 days prior to the opening ceremony. The men's football tournament consisted of 29 teams.

All competing nations were required to send their under-23 teams and a maximum of three over-aged players to participate.

Hosts South Korea defeated their northern neighbours 1–0 thanks to a goal in the last minute of extra time to win the gold medal. Meanwhile, Iraq won the bronze medal after defeating Thailand with the same score.

Venues

Squads

Results
All times are Korea Standard Time (UTC+09:00)

First round

Group A

Group B

Group C

Group D

Group E

Group F

Group G

Group H

Knockout round

Round of 16

Quarterfinals

Semifinals

Bronze medal match

Gold medal match

Goalscorers

Final standing

References

Results

External links
Official website of 2014 Asian Games

Men